World Brotherhood Colonies are an idea for self-sustaining spiritual communities envisioned by Paramahansa Yogananda, the Indian yogi and author of Autobiography of a Yogi and founder of Self-Realization Fellowship / Yogoda Satsanga Society of India. Yogananda envisioned that communities for "plain living and high thinking," would develop as a natural culmination of the spread of his worldwide teachings.
Yogananda established a World Brotherhood Colony at his Self-Realization Fellowship Encinitas center in Southern California and found that organizing spiritual communities for families along the lines he envisioned would take much more time than he then had available. Self-sustaining SRF communities for families will come into being in the future when the time is right. Yogananda abandoned his dream of founding a world-brotherhood colony in Encinitas and turned his mind to organizing the existing communities along more strictly monastic lines.

Paramahansa Yogananda envisioned the development of his spiritual communities beginning with individual home study of the SRF Lessons, and the establishment of small altars for the practice of his teachings of Kriya Yoga meditation in individual homes. Yogananda then envisioned groups of his disciples forming SRF centers for mutual support in meditation and study of his teachings.  The centers would grow until temples would be established, served by SRF ministers of the Self-Realization Order. Eventually, overtime and when the time is right, SRF colonies would naturally form with single and married disciples coming together to form colonies where they would live, work and worship together full-time.

Separate from Yogananda's organization of SRF, on their own, three different direct disciples of Yogananda began three separate communities between 1968 - 1970.  In 1968 Kriyananda started Ananda in Nevada City, California, which he referred to as a World Brotherhood Colony. In 1969 Norman Paulsen created the Sunburst Community in Santa Barbara, California.  In 1970 J. Oliver Black, the leader of the SRF Detroit, Michigan center, began Clear Light Community in Northern Michigan.

Spiritual basis of Colonies
Yogananda often emphasized the need for intentional communities "founded on a spiritual basis." His vision for Colonies included couples, families, and single people sharing a cooperative community life, with the common bond of daily meditation and selfless service. He felt that Colonies would have a far-reaching effect on modern society:

Man is a soul, not an institution; his inner reforms alone can lend permanence to outer ones. By stress on spiritual values, self-realization, a colony exemplifying world brotherhood is empowered to send inspiring vibrations far beyond its locale.

A unique feature of Yogananda's World Brotherhood Colonies idea was that it offered both single and married people and families a spiritually fulfilling community life. Many traditional monastic communities and ashrams offer most of the features of Yogananda's Colonies—simple living, selfless service, cooperation, and daily meditation. But both typically exclude children and couples as residents. Yogananda's disciple, Kamala Silva, recounts a conversation she had with Yogananda just four months before his death:

Practical benefits
Yogananda often spoke of the practical benefits that come from cooperative living. Even though he was a teacher of meditation and yoga, he frequently gave practical advice on subjects such as diet, exercise, business, education, and prosperity. As early as 1932, he urged his students to avoid buying cars and other luxuries on the "installment plan", similar to the modern credit card. Kriyananda, another disciple of Yogananda, heard his Guru tell audiences that living in Colonies would help people be free of many of the ills that beset modern society:

Yogananda's guidelines for establishing colonies
Yogananda wrote a detailed article in East-West magazine in April 1932, describing his idea of "little-group models of ideal civilizations". He encouraged groups of married and single people to pool their money to buy land where they could grow their own food, educate their children, and live a simple life dedicated to meditation.

Practical tips included the necessity of raising your own food:
"All butter and milk should be obtained from home-bred cows, and vegetables should be grown by the members of this spiritual farm on their own land. Lambs should be grown for wool for dresses, socks, and other articles. Hats should not be worn. All the people should wear sandals or go barefooted."

Colonies in India
Richard Wright, Yogananda's secretary, traveled with him to India in 1935-6. Those travels are described in Yogananda's Autobiography of a Yogi. When they returned to America, Wright wrote an article for Inner Culture magazine, talking about Yogananda's enthusiasm for starting Colonies in India. Wright wrote:

Swami Yogananda, through the inspiration of God and the Masters, is planning to create a model Yogoda World-City in Bengal, India, where he wants to combine really necessary industries and scientific training of Yoga. Here people of all races schooled in Yoga will be admitted. This city will be guided by the highest spiritual principles and the laws of universal brotherhood.

Yogananda's enthusiasm for Colonies near the end of his life
Yogananda spoke frequently and passionately about Colonies during the last four years of his life. He was so enthusiastic about the idea, that he once said, "I was thinking so much last night about world brotherhood colonies that my mind didn't want to meditate. Then I chanted a little bit, and my mind came back to me." He also wrote a letter to Henry Ford, founder of the Ford Motor Company, trying to elicit Ford's support for World Brotherhood Colonies. He felt so strongly about the idea, that he once declared, "The day will come when this colony idea will spread through the world like wildfire."

Beverly Hills, 1949
Kriyananda wrote that a talk given by Yogananda on World Brotherhood Colonies was the most stirring lecture he ever heard. The occasion was a garden party in Beverly Hills, in July 1949: 

"This day," he (Yogananda) thundered, punctuating every word, "marks the birth of a new era. My spoken words are registered in the ether, in the Spirit of God, and they shall move the West.... Self-Realization has come to unite all religions.... We must go on — not only those who are here, but thousands of youths must go North, South, East and West to cover the earth with little colonies, demonstrating that simplicity of living plus high thinking lead to the greatest happiness!"

Lake Shrine dedication, 1950
On August 20, 1950, Yogananda dedicated the Self-Realization Fellowship Lake Shrine and Mahatma Gandhi World Peace Shrine at Pacific Palisades, California. He spoke to over 1500 people gathered there for the event. Dignitaries included California's Lieutenant Governor Goodwin Knight, who later became Governor of California. Yogananda's talk appeared in the September 1950 issue of Self-Realization magazine. Much of his lecture revolved around what he called "the art of living", which included advice on how to find spiritual happiness, and how to achieve harmony between all people and religions. He spoke about World Brotherhood Colonies as an important aspect of the art of living:

Autobiography of a Yogi, 1951
Yogananda realized that to properly organize a spiritual community for families would take more time than he had available.  After his plans for the Encinitas world brotherhood colony changed to a monastic ashram center, he made the description in the Autobiography of a Yogi referring to colonies much briefer. He referred to these ashram centers as model "world-brotherhood colonies" demonstrating the life of outer simplicity and inner searching for God that would bring the greatest happiness and fulfillment whether one were pursuing the monastic path or that of the householder.

He wrote in his 1951 third edition of Autobiography of a Yogi:

Communities

Clear Light Community 
J. Oliver Black, a direct disciple of Paramahansa Yogananda, and SRF leader of the Detroit, Michigan center, founded the Song of the Morning Ranch in 1970 which is located in Northern Michigan on the beautifully forested land owned by Golden Lotus, part of the 800 acres on which Song of the Morning Yoga Retreat is also located. It was Black's intent to develop a community on the same property and so the Clear Light Community began to take form in the 1990s on this property under the direction of Bob Raymer, the Spiritual Director from 1991 to 2004. The Community encompasses the loftiest ideals for a balanced, God-permeated life as passed down by their Master, Paramahansa Yogananda; their Founder, J. Oliver Black; and Bob Raymer. In Black's last will and testament he only left two directives: "It is my deepest interest and desire that The Song in the Morning ranch continue in existence for the purpose of furthering the teachings of Paramahansa Yogananda and the Self-Realization Fellowship in Los Angeles, California, together with the establishment of the World Brotherhood Colony as I have directed."

Yogananda envisioned "World Brotherhood Colonies" as places where harmonious people could support each other in the balanced development of body, mind, and soul through the teachings of Yoga. He spoke of "plain living and God thinking," a simple but effective formula to tap into the spiritual reality that flows like a deep river beneath the chaos of our times. Song of the Morning Ranch is the ideal location for such a colony, nested as it is within a state forest teaming with God's boundless variety of life forms, and the deep quiet and peace conducive to inner revelation.

These two communities mentioned below were started by two different individuals and are not affiliated with Paramahansa Yogananda's organization SRF/YSS.

Sunburst Community

In 1969 Norman Paulsen, a direct disciple of Paramahansa Yogananda, started Sunburst Sanctuary, a cooperative communities of men, women and children and a global intentional fellowship located in Santa Barbara, California, California. Our endeavors include organic gardening and farming and a sanctuary dedicated to higher learning and conscious living. Our universal teachings are based upon the message of founder Norman Paulsen and his teacher  Yogananda. This community is set amidst abundant natural beauty and cared for by a cooperative community which includes meditation services, retreats, workshops and events.

Ananda World Brotherhood Colonies

In 1968, Kriyananda, a direct disciple of Yogananda, started his first Ananda community outside Nevada City, California, based on Yogananda's World Brotherhood Colonies principles. The community includes schools (kindergarten through high school), private and community-owned businesses, gardens, a guest retreat and teaching center, a healing center, a museum and gift shop, publishing company, and more. Adult residents are all disciples of Yogananda, and practice their Kriya Yoga meditation teachings. Residents include couples, families, single people, and monks.

Since the founding of Ananda Village, Kriyananda began eight more World Brotherhood Colonies. As of 2007, there were approximately 1,000 residents living in these colonies. They include rural and urban models of Yogananda's idea and are located in: Palo Alto, Sacramento, and Nevada City, California; Portland, Oregon; and Seattle, Washington (all in the U.S.); Assisi, Italy; and Delhi, Gurgaon and Pune, India.

References

External links

Ananda World Brotherhood Colonies
Clear Light Community
Sunburst Community
Hope for a Better World (online book), by Kriyananda
How to Burn Out the Roots of Depression by Divine Methods Article by Paramhansa Yogananda from East-West Magazine, April 1932.
"Yogoda World City Planned" Article from Inner Culture magazine, March 1937

Ashrams
Intentional communities in the United States
Paramahansa Yogananda
Simple living
Utopian communities